Kvinnliga medborgarskolan vid Fogelstad (Fogelstad Citizen School for Women) was a Swedish education center for women, active from 1922 until 1954. The purpose of the center was to educate women in their new rights and responsibilities as citizens after women suffrage had been achieved in 1921. 

The center was founded by the Fogelstadgruppen (Fogelstad Group), a women's group which also managed the Frisinnade kvinnors riksförbund (Union of Liberal Women) and the magazine Tidevarvet, and it was situated at the Folgestad manor, which was owned by one of the members: Elisabeth Tamm, herself one of the first women in the Swedish parliament.

See also
 Behörighetslagen

References
Lena Eskilsson, Drömmen om kamratsamhället. Kvinnliga medborgarskolan på Fogelsta 1925-35, Carlssons 1991,  
Ulrika Knutson, Kvinnor på gränsen till genombrott: grupporträtt av Tidevarvets kvinnor, Bonnier 2004, 
Hjördis Levin, Kvinnorna på barrikaden. Sexualpolitik och sociala frågor 1923-36, Carlssons 1997, 

History of women in Sweden
1922 in Sweden
1922 establishments in Sweden
1922 in women's history